Janette Husárová and Natalia Medvedeva were the defending champions but did not compete that year.

Eva Melicharová and Helena Vildová won in the final 6–2, 6–2 against Radka Bobková and Wiltrud Probst.

Seeds
Champion seeds are indicated in bold text while text in italics indicates the round in which those seeds were eliminated.

 Barbara Schett /  Patty Schnyder (semifinals)
 Eva Melicharová /  Helena Vildová (champions)
 Laura Garrone /  Gloria Pizzichini (quarterfinals)
 Catherine Barclay /  Magdalena Grzybowska (quarterfinals)

Draw

External links
 1997 Meta Styrian Open Doubles Draw

WTA Austrian Open
1997 WTA Tour